Carlos "Camilo" Rivas  (born 1898, date of death unknown) was an Argentine track and field athlete. Rivas competed in the men's 100 metres hurdles and the men's 4 x 100 metres relay at the 1924 Summer Olympics.

References

External links
 

1898 births
Year of death missing
Argentine male sprinters
Athletes (track and field) at the 1924 Summer Olympics
Olympic athletes of Argentina
20th-century Argentine people